Benjamin Franklin Baker (July 26, 1864 – April 10, 1939) was an American businessman and politician.

Background
Baker was born in Aurora, Illinois. He lived in Kewanee, Illinois with his wife and family. Baker worked in the manufacturing business and was chairman of the Kewanee Boiler Corporation. He served in the Illinois Senate from 1907 to 1911 and was involved with the Republican Party. Baker also served as mayor of Kewanee from 1911 to 1919. Baker died in Kewanee, Illinois from complications from an appendectomy.

Notes

External links

1864 births
1939 deaths
People from Aurora, Illinois
People from Kewanee, Illinois
Businesspeople from Illinois
Mayors of places in Illinois
Republican Party Illinois state senators